Jack Walrath Quintet at Umbria Jazz Festival, Vol. 1 is a live album by trumpeter Jack Walrath which was recorded at the Umbria Jazz Festival in 1983 and released on the Italian Red label in 1985.

Reception

The AllMusic review by Scott Yanow stated "The playing is excellent but little all that memorable actually occurs on this worthwhile but average postbop set".

Track listing
All compositions by Jack Walrath
 "Two In One" – 11:35
 "Blue Moves" – 9:05
 "John Agar" – 27:00

Personnel
Jack Walrath – trumpet 
Glenn Ferris – trombone
Michael Cochrane – piano
Anthony Cox – bass 
Mike Clark – drums

References

Red Records live albums
Jack Walrath live albums
1985 live albums